Radiant Glacier is part of the Waddington Range in the southern British Columbia Coast Mountains (51°26'00''N, 125°13'00''W). It flows to the northeast from Mount Tiedemann for approximately  before joining the larger Scimitar Glacier.

References

Glaciers of the Pacific Ranges